Cornelius Booth (December 28, 1830 – May 31, 1903) was a Canadian politician. He served in the Legislative Assembly of British Columbia from 1871 to 1872 from the electoral district of Cariboo.

References

1832 births
1903 deaths